Sperber may refer to:

 Focke-Wulf A 33 Sperber, a small German airliner produced in the early 1930s
 Sportavia Sperber, a variant of the Fournier RF 5 aircraft
 Sperber (surname)
 , a cruiser built for the German Imperial Navy in 1887-1889

German words and phrases